The Tonga national under-17 football team represents Tonga in international under-17 or youth football competitions and is controlled by the Tonga Football Association.

Competition record

FIFA U-17 World Cup record

OFC U-17 Championship record
The OFC U-17 Championship is a tournament held once every two years to decide the only two qualification spots for the Oceania Football Confederation (OFC) and its representatives at the FIFA U-17 World Cup.

Current squad

Squad for the 2017 OFC U-17 Championship first round

Squad for the 2015 OFC U-17 Championship

|-

! colspan="9"  style="background:#b0d3fb; text-align:left;"|
|- style="background:#dfedfd;"

|-

! colspan="9"  style="background:#b0d3fb; text-align:left;"|
|- style="background:#dfedfd;"

|-
! colspan="9"  style="background:#b0d3fb; text-align:left;"|
|- style="background:#dfedfd;"

Squad for the 2013 OFC U-17 Championship

|-

! colspan="9"  style="background:#b0d3fb; text-align:left;"|
|- style="background:#dfedfd;"

|-

! colspan="9"  style="background:#b0d3fb; text-align:left;"|
|- style="background:#dfedfd;"

|-
! colspan="9"  style="background:#b0d3fb; text-align:left;"|
|- style="background:#dfedfd;"

Results and fixtures

2016

2018

List of coaches
  Chris Williams (2011)
  Timote Moleni (2013-2016)
  Lafaele Moala (2018-)

References

External links
 Tonga Football Federation official website

under-17
Oceanian national under-17 association football teams